Molly Jane Lucy Burke (born February 8, 1994) is a Canadian YouTube personality and motivational speaker whose eponymous channel has just under 2 million subscribers. Burke was diagnosed at age four with retinitis pigmentosa, a condition which causes loss of vision. She lost most of her sight at age 14. Previously, she was a spokesperson for Foundation Fighting Blindness Canada.

Burke's content focuses on her experiences with blindness, fashion and makeup advice, and vlogs about her daily life and activities. She advocates for disability rights. She also shows her experiences with her guide dog Elton John along with her cat Lavender and her retired dogs, Gallop, Bennix and Gypsy.

In 2019, Burke released an audiobook on Audible, called It's Not What It Looks Like.

Awards and honors
 Lifestyle, Shorty Awards, 2019
 Breakout YouTuber, Shorty Awards, 2018

References

External links
 

Canadian blind people
Canadian disability rights activists
Canadian YouTubers
Lifestyle YouTubers
1994 births

Living people

People from Oakville, Ontario